Richelle Ann Mallari Loyola-Avanzado (born January 31, 1979), better known by her stage name Jessa Zaragoza, is a Filipina commercial model, singer and actress. She is known as the "Phenomenal Diva" and "Jukebox Queen of the 90s" for her first studio album Just Can't Help Feelin in 1997 with the hit carrier single "Bakit Pa?," which became a number one ballad in the Philippines and a top 40 hit during 1997–1999. The album also was certified by PARI and certified platinum. Its carrier single "Bakit Pa?" was also released by OctoArts Films and GMA Films (now GMA Pictures) as a Valentine's Day film offering directed by multi-awarded film Director Jose Javier Reyes. She collaborated with award-winning film director Mel Chionglo in Malikot na Mundo with actors Lara Morena, Raymond Bagatsing, and Patrick Guzman, her last film with OctoArts Films. In 2000, she also released her fourth studio album and first for Star Music Ibigay Mo Na. She released Kahit Na Ilang Umaga in 2004. She sang a cover of "Sana'y Wala Nang Wakas" for the hit prime time series of the same name. In 2002–2003, she played Andromeda on the hit series Bituin with Nora Aunor and Cherie Gil.

In 2008 she sang a revival of Didith Reyes' hit song "Bakit Ako Mahihiya" for the critically acclaimed series Eva Fonda starring Cristine Reyes. She released her album Jessa Sings the Great Musical Icons under MCA Music in 2009. In 2012, she released her seventh studio album entitled Pag Wala Na ang Ulan with GMA Music. From 2012 to present, she has been appearing on the weekly comedy show Pepito Manaloto as DeeDee alongside veteran comedian Nova Villa. This is Zaragoza's return to comedy after the 2001 sitcom Attagirl on ABS-CBN.

In 2021, she is one of the Jukebosses in the hit karaoke TV show Sing Galing with other singers and songwriters Rey Valera, Randy Santiago and K Brosas on TV5.

In a 2016 interview with Vehnee Saturno says the peg for the song “Bakit Pa?” Was Zaragoza intentionally she is called The Toni Braxton persona during the thought process of the Certified Radio Hit

Biography
Zaragoza was a GMA Network talent using her real name Richelle Ann Loyola when she auditioned for Little Miss Philippines in Eat Bulaga! in 1987. In the early 1990s, she was part of German Moreno's longest running variety show, That's Entertainment. She was also part of comedy shows Alabang Girls on ABC (now TV5) from 1992 to 1994.She did guesting stints for GMA and Viva Entertainment TV programs in the mid 90s she has guest starred in Bubble Gang Beh Bote Nga And AttaGirl in 2001 for ABS-CBN 2

Zaragoza is also a singer. She signed a contract with OctoArts EMI Philippines (now PolyEast Records). Her first album Just Can't Help Feelin''' was released in 1997. Her second album Phenomonal was released in 1999. She later transferred to rival network ABS-CBN from 2000 to 2004, and signed a deal with its recording company Star Records, releasing her next two albums Ibigay Mo Na (2000) and Kahit Na Ilang Umaga (2004). She also sang the theme songs for soap operas and TV series of ABS-CBN and GMA.

Among her most popular songs is "Bakit Pa," which was the soundtrack to a romantic comedy film she starred in, also entitled Bakit Pa? with Troy Montero and Diether Ocampo as her leading men. The film was released in theaters on February 3, 1999, as a Valentine's movie presentation of Octoarts and GMA Films. She was also part of a soap opera that ran from May to October 1999 on GMA Network entitled Di Ba't Ikaw.

In 2000, she released new hit singles such as "Ibigay Mo Na", "Siya Ba Ang Dahilan" and "Kung Kailan Pa". Ibigay Mo Na was controversial for its album layout and sexually themed song, which was criticized for being painfully harmful but a heartfelt ballad.

In 2001, Zaragoza sang the theme song of the ABS-CBN afternoon soap, Recuerdo de Amor which ran from 2001 to 2003. She was also cast in another ABS-CBN soap which starred Nora Aunor, Carol Banawa and Desiree del Valle entitled Bituin. She also starred on the hit sitcom Attagirl alongside Vanessa Del Bianco, Andrea del Rosario and Desiree del Valle which ran for three seasons.

In 2003, she sang the theme song of ABS-CBN's Sana'y Wala Nang Wakas. The song was featured on her album Kahit Na Ilang Umaga, released by Star Records.

In 2004, she participated at the Himig Handog Songwriting Contest interpreting the song "Hindi Na Bale" composed by Jimmy Antiporda.

In 2006, she collaborated with her singer-songwriter husband, Dingdong Avanzado on the duet album, Laging Ikaw, released under Universal Records. During the 2006 period she had worked with fellow friends comedian Marissa Sanchez, and actress Ara Mina on a worldwide concert tour called The Divas Tour. It was produced by Dingdong Avanzado and was a successful concert, running for six months in different parts of the world.

In 2007, controversy erupted between her and Rufa Mae Quinto when Quinto allegedly interpreted and stated that Zaragoza was the reason of hers and Dingdong's breakup. It became one of Philippine showbiz's most memorable breakups. Zaragoza defended herself against the allegations on a live interview on GMA's Startalk. Quinto appeared on YES magazine as a featured artist on the front cover, and in the article she talked about her personal life and past relationships.

In 2009, after a series of shows in the U.S. together with Avanzado, Zaragoza came back on prime time television in the remake of the Mexican telenovela Rosalinda. She also released an album that featured all cover versions on Jessa Sings the Great Musical Icons. The album paid tribute to such musical legends such as Elvis Presley, the Beatles, Tina Turner, Sting and the Police, Madonna and Stevie Wonder.

In 2010, she went back to ABS-CBN to be part of the short-lived prime time television series, 1DOL. She then made several guest TV appearances, performing renditions of songs with Avanzado.

Zaragoza also appeared in an episode of Wansapanataym: Super Kikay and the Flying Pagong with Kim Chiu.

In 2012, she portrayed Angela in the afternoon soap based on the 1989 film produced by Seiko Films' Ruben Marcelino, Kokak as the mother to title protagonist Sarah Lahbati. In July of that year, her album Pag Wala Na Ang Ulan was released under GMA Records. The album includes the song "Nasaan" from the TV series Kung Aagawin Mo Ang Langit on GMA.

On August 3, 2013, she released a digital single called "Missing You" in two different languages; Tagalog and English.

On August 7, 2014, Zaragoza interpreted "Bumabalik Ang Nagdaan" with Star Music (formerly known as Star Records) for the Himig Handog P-Pop Love Songs. This is her third time to interpret a song for the Himig Handog Love Song Contest, together with her former singles "Susubukan Kong Muli" (2001) and "Hindi Na Bale" (2005) were released during those years. Hindi Na Bale was also her second time working with Jimmy Antiporda and was also revived by Bugoy Drillon in 2010. This Is her comeback to the recording company after 9 years for the Interpretation of the song her previous works were the albums Ibigay Mo Na (2000) and Kahit Na Ilang Umaga (2003–2004) album.

The year 2017 marked a peak Zaragoza's career when she and her husband Avanzado launched their 20/30 album, a revival and commemorative album.

Personal life
Zaragoza is married to singer Dingdong Avanzado. The wedding happened on March 18, 2001, and was highly publicized in newspapers and television talk shows. They have a daughter named Jayda. They were called the prince of pop and jukebox queen of the Philippines when they lived in Vallejo, California, in 2007.

Filmography
Television

Discography
 1997: Just Can't Help Feelin' (first album with OctoArts EMI Philippines, now called Polyeast Records) the debut album of Jessa Zaragaosa that start her music career. The album includes her 4 successful singles such as Bakit Pa?, Pa'no Kaya?, Di Bat Ikaw and the album title Just Can't Help Feelin. Digitally released in 2014
 1998: PhenomenalDigitally released in May 26,2014
 1999: Siya Ba Ang Dahilan? (final album with OctoArts EMI Philippines)
 1999: The Best Of (compilation album of best hits produced by OctoArts EMI Philippines) Only available for release through Cassette and CD
 2000: Ibigay Mo Na(first album produced with Star Music, second album of the year released in 2000) Re Released for Digital in 2011 and internationally in 2015
 2004: Kahit Na Ilang Umaga (final album produced and released in 2004–2005 with Star Music) last album released on Cassette in 2004
 2005: Laging Ikaw (duet album with Dingdong Avanzado, including duets of best hits)
 2009: Sings the Great Musical Icons I (an all-cover album with Universal Records)
 2012: Pag Wala Na Ang Ulan'' (GMA Music)

Songs sampled from Dingdong Avanzado 
Maghihintay Sayo (2000) in Ibigay Mo Na
Kung Maibabalik (2003) in Kahit Na Ilang Umaga

References

External links
Official website

1979 births
Living people
Filipino film actresses
Filipino child actresses
Filipino television actresses
That's Entertainment Tuesday Group Members
That's Entertainment (Philippine TV series)
GMA Network personalities
ABS-CBN personalities
TV5 (Philippine TV network) personalities
20th-century Filipino actresses
21st-century Filipino actresses
Star Music artists
GMA Music artists
21st-century Filipino singers
21st-century Filipino women singers